Archibald Standish Hartrick  (7 August 1864 – 1 February 1950) was a Scottish painter known for the quality of his lithographic work. His works covered urban scenes, landscapes and figure painting and he was a founder member of the Senefelder Club.

Life and work

Hartrick was born in Bangalore, the son of an officer in the British Army. The family moved to Scotland when Hartrick was two years old. His father died shortly afterwards and in due course his mother married Charles Blatherwick, a doctor and keen amateur watercolourist who had been involved in the establishment of the Royal Scottish Society of Painters in Watercolour. After attending Fettes College, Hartrick studied medicine at Edinburgh University before studying art at the Slade School of Art in London and then at both the Academie Julian and the Atelier Cormon in Paris. Hartrick spent the summer of 1886 at Pont-Aven with Paul Gauguin. In Paris he had become friends with Vincent van Gogh and Toulouse-Lautrec and exhibited a work at the Paris Salon in 1887. Hartrick drew and painted Gauguin, van Gogh and Toulouse-Lautrec during his time in France.

Hartrick returned to Scotland and for a while settled in Glasgow, where he came to know the Glasgow Boys, before he moved to London. There he began work as a book illustrator and as an illustrator with The Graphic in 1890, then with the Pall Mall Magazine in 1893. Hartrick became a prolific magazine artist and also provided illustrations for the magazine Black and White, for the Daily Chronicle, The Ludgate Monthly and Pall Mall Budget.

Also in 1890, Hartrick joined the New English Art Club. From 1895 until 1907, he exhibited regularly at the Royal Academy. In 1896 he married the painter Lily Blatherwick, the daughter of Charles Blatherwick from his first marriage. The couple settled in Tresham in Gloucestershire, from where they both pursued their artistic careers; they both had works shown at the Continental Gallery in 1901. Hatrick and his wife later redecorated the small church in Tresham and she is buried in the graveyard there. Hartrick moved to London, where he taught drawing at the Camberwell School of Art from 1908 to 1914 and later at the Central School of Art, where he taught lithography until 1929. At Camberwell he taught David Jones. In 1909 Hartrick was among the founding members of the Senefelder Club and later became a Vice-President of the club. In 1910 Hartrick was elected an associate member of the Royal Watercolour Society and became a full member in 1920. Eventually Hartrick had over 200 works shown at the Royal Watercolour Society and he also exhibited at the Venice Biennale on three occasions. His work was also part of the painting event in the art competition at the 1932 Summer Olympics. A series of his works showing rural characters, entitled Cotswold Types was acquired by the British Museum.
 
During the First World War, Hartrick contributed works to the British War Memorials Committee collection of artworks. In 1917 Hartrick produced six lithographs on Women's Work for the War Propaganda Bureau's Britain's Efforts and Ideals portfolio of images which were exhibited in Britain and abroad and were also sold as prints to raise money for the war effort. During the war he also produced a series of twelve lithographs under the title London in Wartime. At the start of the Second World War, he was among the first to offer his services to the War Artists' Advisory Committee. In 1940 he was the first artist commissioned to record the work of the Women's Land Army, the same subject he had covered in World War One. Prints of his work were sold in at the National Gallery during the war and featured in the Britain at War exhibition that opened at the Museum of Modern Art in New York in May 1941. During the war, Hatrick also painted scenes near his former home at Tresham in Gloustershire for the Recording Britain scheme. The Arts Council organized a memorial exhibition for Hartrick in 1951.

Published works
 1916: Post-impressionism, with some personal recollections of Vincent Van Gogh & Paul Gauguin
 1932: Lithography as a Fine Art
 1939: A Painter's Pilgrimage through Fifty Years.

References

External links
 

1864 births
1950 deaths
19th-century British printmakers
19th-century Scottish male artists
19th-century Scottish painters
20th-century British printmakers
20th-century Scottish male artists
20th-century Scottish painters
Academics of Camberwell College of Arts
Academics of the Central School of Art and Design
Académie Julian alumni
Alumni of the Slade School of Fine Art
Alumni of the University of Edinburgh
Artists from Bangalore
British war artists
Olympic competitors in art competitions
Painters from Karnataka
People educated at Fettes College
Scottish etchers
Scottish printmakers
Scottish male painters
Scottish watercolourists
World War I artists
World War II artists